Valea Satului may refer to the following places:

Populated places
 Valea Satului, a village in Dolinnoe commune, Criuleni district, Moldova
 Valea Satului, a village in Grajduri commune, Iași County, Romania
 Valea Satului, a village in Vulpeni commune, Olt County, Romania

Rivers in Romania
 Valea Satului, a tributary of the Axin in Caraș-Severin County
 Valea Satului, a tributary of the Burla in Botoșani County
 Valea Satului, a tributary of the Calva in Sibiu County
 Valea Satului (Crișul Alb), in Hunedoara County
 Valea Satului, a tributary of the Crișul Repede in Bihor and Cluj Counties
 Valea Satului, a tributary of the Danube near Dubova, Mehedinți County
 Valea Satului, a tributary of the Danube near Eșelnița, Mehedinți County
 Valea Satului (Geamărtălui), in Dolj and Olt Counties
 Valea Satului (Iza), in Maramureș County
 Valea Satului, a tributary of the Lotru near Brezoi, Vâlcea County
 Valea Satului, a tributary of the Lotru near Malaia, Vâlcea County
 Valea Satului (Olt), a tributary of the Olt near Câineni, Vâlcea County
 Valea Satului, a tributary of the Olt near Jiblea, Vâlcea County
 Valea Satului, a tributary of the Rebra in Bistrița-Năsăud County
 Valea Satului, a tributary of the Suhu in Galați County
 Valea Satului, a tributary of the Tău in Caraș-Severin County
 Valea Satului, a tributary of the Topolog in Argeș County

See also
Valea (disambiguation)